The Shire of Heytesbury was a local government area about  west-southwest of Melbourne, the state capital of Victoria, Australia.

History

Heytesbury was originally located within the Hampden and Heytesbury Road District, which was incorporated on 28 April 1857. On 31 May 1895, Heytesbury split away from the East and West Ridings of the Shire of Hampden, to become a shire in its own right. On 6 May 1919, parts of its area split away to join parts of the Shires of Colac and Winchelsea, to form the Shire of Otway. Otway annexed a small part of Heytesbury in 1969.

On 23 September 1994, the Shire of Heytesbury was abolished, and along with the Town of Camperdown, the Shire of Hampden, and parts of the Shires of Colac, Mortlake and the area around Princetown, on the Great Ocean Road, was merged into the newly created Shire of Corangamite. A small part in the shire's east was transferred to the newly created Shire of Colac Otway.

Wards

The Shire of Heytesbury was divided into three ridings, each of which elected three councillors:
 East Riding
 West Riding
 South Riding

Towns and localities
 Bostocks Creek
 Brucknell
 Bungador
 Carpendeit
 Cobden*
 Cobrico
 Cowleys Creek
 Curdies River
 Curdievale
 Dixie
 Ecklin South
 Elingamite
 Glenfyne
 Jancourt
 Koallah
 Lower Heytesbury
 Newfield
 Pomborneit
 Port Campbell
 Scotts Creek
 Simpson
 Stoneyford
 Tandarook
 Tesbury
 Timboon

* Council seat.

Population

* Estimate in the 1958 Victorian Year Book.

References

External links
 Victorian Places - Heytesbury Shire

Heytesbury